Run for Courage is a nonprofit organization that combats human trafficking. The organization is based in Sacramento, California, and raises money for human trafficking victims and their families. Ashlie Bryant is the executive director of Run for Courage. The founder was Vicki Zito, whose daughter was abducted at age seventeen and sexually trafficked in the East Bay. The organization was founded in 2009 and holds a charity run annually, raising more than $550,000 within its first four years. In 2010, the funds raised were donated to Courage House, a building in Roseville, California, that houses teen sex trafficking victims. Approximately 2000 people participated in the 2011 run. That year, the funds raised went to Agape International Missions, A New Day For Children, Courage To Be You, and WIND Youth Services. In 2014, FreeFall Stage produced performances of She Has a Name, a play about human trafficking, and Run for Courage partnered in this initiative, having representatives at each performance.

References

Charities based in California
2009 establishments in California
Organizations established in 2009
Organizations that combat human trafficking
Victims' rights organizations
Organizations based in Sacramento, California
Sex worker organizations in the United States
Human trafficking in the United States
Annual events in California
Challenge walks
Forced prostitution in the United States